George Coleman Martin (May 16, 1910, Everett, Washington - May 21, 2003) was a project engineer on the Boeing B-47 and chief project engineer of the Boeing B-52.

Education
After graduating from Everett High School, Martin enrolled at the University of Washington in Seattle, where he majored in aeronautical engineering.  While a student at Washington, he was inducted into the Tau Beta Pi engineering honor society, and became a brother of the Alpha Kappa Lambda social fraternity.  He graduated from Washington in 1931.

References

1910 births
2003 deaths
Boeing people
University of Washington College of Engineering alumni